Jonathan Lee Nam Heng (born 7 November 1964), better known as Li Nanxing, is a Singaporean actor and was named as 'Ah-Ge' (大哥, "big brother") of Caldecott Hill. He is also a film director and producer.

Li has acted in many Chinese-language television dramas produced by MediaCorp Channel 8. He had won the Best Actor awards three times in the Star Awards, an annual acting awards in Singapore. Li was also one of the first batch of actors to receive the All-Time Favourite Artiste award with Zoe Tay & Chew Chor Meng.

Career 
Li Nanxing attended Singapore Broadcasting Corporation's drama training course before debuting in 1986 with Crossroads. Li gradually rose to stardom in the 1990s. In 1993, he rose to prominence when starring in The Unbeatables I, the first ever gambling drama series produced in Singapore, alongside Zoe Tay. For most of the 1990s, he, Tay and Chew Chor Meng were MediaCorp's three most popular actors and he was voted the Top 10 Most Popular Male Artistes ten years in a row and also won several Malaysia and Taiwan popularity polls at the Star Awards. In 2004 he was awarded the All-Time Favourite Artiste award.

In the 2000s, Li bought a fish farm and managed it with his uncle.

During the late 2000s, his career hit a rocky phase due to personal issues. After a two-year hiatus, Li made his comeback in On the Fringe 2011 and also directed his first film, The Ultimate Winner. He also produced the film, Imperfect, which he co-starred with Ian Fang and Kimberly Chia.

Some of his more famous shows include The Unbeatables trilogy and The Magnate; Li has also acted in 6 telemovies to date, and even sang the theme song of several of his shows. He mostly played in anti-hero roles such in The Vagrant, for which he won the Best Actor award at the Star Awards 2002 and On the Fringe 2011. In September 2012 it was announced that he will be cast in C.L.I.F. II as a police officer, which will be one of the few times he plays a protagonist.

In 2004, Li founded his own talent management agency, LNX Global, named after his initials. Constance Song was LNX's first artiste to be managed under LNX in 2015. 

In 2019, Li signed under Zhao Wei's management agency to manage his presence in China. He was then cast in Zhao's web drama series, Everyone Wants To Meet You, which was filmed in China, in the same year. The series was released in February 2020 on IQIYI.

Personal life 
Li married Yang Libing, a fellow Singaporean actress, in 1994 after co-starring together in several drama series. They divorced in 2004 citing irreconcilable personality differences. Both have yet to remarry and they have no children from the marriage.

Li battled with gambling addiction and had to work as a Hollywood ‘calefare’ to pay off his debts in the 1990s. During this period, he became a Christian, having credited a miraculous experience he had while on a karaoke trip with a friend in Thailand.

Filmography

Film

Television

Variety shows

Awards

References

External links
Official Website
Profile on xin.msn.com

Living people
1964 births
Converts to evangelical Christianity from Roman Catholicism
Singaporean male television actors
Singaporean male film actors
Singaporean people of Teochew descent
Singaporean Christians
Singaporean film directors
20th-century Singaporean male actors
21st-century Singaporean male actors